Hypercompe gaujoni is a moth of the family Erebidae first described by Paul Dognin in 1889. It is found in Ecuador.

References

Hypercompe
Moths described in 1889